Foard-Tatum House is a historic plantation house located near Cooleemee, Davie County, North Carolina. It was built about 1845, and is a two-story, three bay, timber frame dwelling in a transitional Federal /Greek Revival style.  The interior is in the style of Asher Benjamin and a rear ell was added in the 1860s or 1870s.  Also on the property are the contributing log smokehouse and corn crib.

It was added to the National Register of Historic Places in 1994.

References

Plantation houses in North Carolina
Houses on the National Register of Historic Places in North Carolina
Federal architecture in North Carolina
Greek Revival houses in North Carolina
Houses completed in 1845
Houses in Davie County, North Carolina
National Register of Historic Places in Davie County, North Carolina